Kim Rosamond (born February 17, 1975) is the head coach of the Tennessee Tech women's basketball team.  She was named head coach on March 31, 2016.
She was previously an assistant coach for the Vanderbilt Commodores for 9 years and an assistant at Middle Tennessee State University  from 2003 to 2005, where she also served one month as interim head coach. Rosamond was hired by Tennessee Tech following the 2015–2016 season, when Jim Davis retired. In 2020 her contract was extended through 2025. She attended high school at Winston Academy in Louisville, Mississippi and played for Ole Miss in college. While at Ole Miss, she was the first player to earn all-academic SEC honors all four years. After her playing career at Ole Miss, she was an assistant there for 5 years.

Head coaching record

References

Living people
American women's basketball coaches
Tennessee Tech Golden Eagles women's basketball coaches
1975 births